M Alimullah Miyan (15 February 1942-10 May 2017) is the pioneer of non-government university in Bangladesh and founder of the International University of Business Agriculture and Technology (IUBAT). He was director and professor at the University of Dhaka’s IBA, and founder chairman of the Centre for Population Management and Research (CPMR).

Early life 
Miyan was born on 15 February 1942 in Kailine, Chandina Upazila, Comilla District, East Bengal, British India. Miyan completed his Honours and Masters degrees from University of Dhaka in 1962 and 1963 respectively. After, he received his MBA at Indiana University in 1968 and his Doctorate at the Manchester Business School in 1976.

Career 
Miyan taught at the Institute of Business Administration at the University of Dhaka. He founded the Centre for Population Management and Research and served as its first chairman. He was a director of Institute of Business Administration.

Miyan founded the International University of Business Agriculture and Technology in 1991. He became the Vice-Chancellor of International University of Business Agriculture and Technology in 1994. He was a founding member of Association of Management Development Institutions in South Asia. He was an executive member of the International Society for Labour and Social Security Law. He was a member of the International Labour and Employment Relations Association.

In June 2007, Miyan attended a meeting of the Association of Private Universities of Bangladesh which called for the withdrawal of VAT placed on private universities.

Miyan was the president of Rotary Club of Greater Dhaka in 2008. He signed a cooperation agreement with the University of Michigan–Flint. He opposed the private university ordinance-2008 proposed by the caretaker government.

Miyan launched the Bangladeshi chapter of World Wide Opportunities on Organic Farms based in International University of Business Agriculture and Technology in 2010. He was the Secretary General of Association of Private Universities of Bangladesh. He signed an agreement with the University of Victoria on behalf of International University of Business Agriculture and Technology.

Bibliography

Death and legacy 
Miyan died on 10 May 2017 at Apollo Hospital Dhaka, Bangladesh. In the International University of Business Agriculture and Technology, a scholarship was created in memory of Miyan for one expert graduate from every village beneath neath Knowledge-Based Area Development (KBAD). M Allimullah Miyan Research Institute opened on January 1, 2019 in IUBAT. It organizes the research activity of the university including undergraduate research.

References 

1942 births
2017 deaths
People from Comilla District
University of Dhaka alumni
Indiana University alumni
Alumni of the Manchester Business School
Academic staff of the University of Dhaka
Vice-Chancellors of universities in Bangladesh